Bulend Biščević (born 10 March 1975) is a Bosnian retired professional footballer who played firstly as a right-back, and then as a midfielder.

Club career

Željezničar
Born in Sarajevo, SFR Yugoslavia, present day Bosnia and Herzegovina, Biščević spent almost his entire career playing for hometown club Željezničar. That is the club where he began playing football as a child, and in 1994 he started playing for the first team. At first, he played as a right-back, but in 2001, Željezničar's manager Amar Osim moved him to midfield. That was the position in which Biščević showed his real qualities. He was a hard-working player who ran a lot and was mostly oriented in disrupting opposite teams play. Biščević had good technique, so he would, if needed, play in more offensive roles.

During his ten period with Željezničar, he had many success. Biščević won three Bosnian Premier League titles, three Bosnian Cups and three, now defunct, Bosnian Supercups.

Later career and retirement
In 2004, Biščević moved to Cypriot First Division side AEP Paphos. He then moved to Hajduk Split at the beginning of the next year, where he won the 1. HNL and the Croatian Super Cup. Finally, in the 2006 winter transfer window, Biščević came back to Bosnia and Herzegovina and signed a contract with Zrinjski Mostar. Before the start of 2006–07 season, he decided to retire from professional football at only the age of 31.

International career

He made his debut for Bosnia and Herzegovina in an August 1999 friendly match away against Liechtenstein and has earned a total of 19 caps, scoring no goals. His final international was a February 2005 friendly against Iran.

Honours

Player
Željezničar  
Bosnian Premier League: 1997–98, 2000–01, 2001–02
Bosnian Cup: 1999–00, 2000–2001, 2002–03
Bosnian Supercup: 1998, 2000, 2001

Hajduk Split
1. HNL: 2004–05
Croatian Super Cup: 2005

References

External links
Bulend Biščević at Sofascore

1975 births
Living people
Footballers from Sarajevo
Association football fullbacks
Association football midfielders
Bosnia and Herzegovina footballers
Bosnia and Herzegovina international footballers
FK Željezničar Sarajevo players
AEP Paphos FC players
HNK Hajduk Split players
HŠK Zrinjski Mostar players
Premier League of Bosnia and Herzegovina players
Cypriot First Division players
Croatian Football League players
Bosnia and Herzegovina expatriate footballers
Expatriate footballers in Cyprus
Bosnia and Herzegovina expatriate sportspeople in Cyprus
Expatriate footballers in Croatia
Bosnia and Herzegovina expatriate sportspeople in Croatia